Gomoa West District is one of the twenty-two districts in Central Region, Ghana. Originally it was formerly part of the then-larger Gomoa District in 1988, until the eastern part of the district was split off to create the first Gomoa East District, with Gomoa Afransi as its capital town, on 29 February 2008 (which was later split off into two new districts on 15 March 2018: Gomoa Central District (capital: Gomoa Afransi), and the present Gomoa East District (capital: Potsin)); thus the remaining part has been renamed as Gomoa West District. Its population is 44,834 people. The district assembly is located in the southeast part of Central Region and has Apam as its capital town.

List of settlements

List of schools
The following are list of Senior High Schools located within the Gomoa West District:
Senior secondary schools
 Apam Senior High School  (public)
 Charity Senior High School   (private)
 Gomoa Secondary Technical Senior High School  (public)
 Mozano Senior High School  (public)
 Mumford Community Senior High School  (public)
Junior secondary schools
 Apam Methodist School
 Apam Catholic School
 Apam Anglican School
 Apam Salvation Army School
 Apam Presby School
 Royal Preparatory School
 Genesis Preparatory School
 Faith Academy School
 Odina/Oguaa Mozama Pry&J.H.S
Gomoa Dunkwa
 Gomoa Enyeme SDA Primary School
 Gomoa Enyeme L/A Junior High School
 WOP Methodist "A" Primary & JHS
 WOP Methodist "B" Primary & JHS
 SDA Primary School - Osedze

References 

Central Region (Ghana)

Districts of the Central Region (Ghana)